Chips is Bethesda-Chevy Chase High School's literary magazine. The magazine was started in 1937 and is published annually.

Awards
Chips has, throughout its existence, received many awards, notably from the Columbia Scholastic Press Association (CSPA) and the National Council of Teachers of English (NCTE).

 CSPA, High School Silver Magazine Crown
 Maryland District of Columbia Scholastic Press Association Gold Rating: 2009-2011
 National Council of Teachers of English Highest Award: 2001, 2002, 2005, 2009-2011
 Journalism Education Association Best of Show Award: 2001

Staff 
 Editor in chief: Morgan Powell
 Writing editor: Angela White
 Art editors: Catherina Leipold and Haley Wessel
 Music editor: Greg Picard
 Financial editor: Sasha Harper
 Creative writing editor: Matt Whitstock 
 Layout editor: Alexia Chatfield 
 Faculty sponsor: Dawn Charles

References

External links
 Official website
 Information on school website

Literary magazines published in the United States
Annual magazines published in the United States
Magazines established in 1937
Magazines published in Maryland
1937 establishments in Maryland